Lyman County is a county located in the U.S. state of South Dakota. As of the 2020 census, the population was 3,718. Its county seat is Kennebec.

Lyman County was created by the Dakota Territorial Legislature on January 8, 1873, but was not organized until May 21, 1893. Its boundaries were altered in 1891, 1897, 1898, and 1916. The county was named for W. P. Lyman, a politician.

History
Lyman County was created in 1873 and organized in 1893. Oacoma served as its first county seat in 1891; in 1922 the seat was transferred to Kennebec.

Geography
Lyman County is bordered on the north and east by the Missouri River, which flows southerly along its edge, and the western portion of its south line is also delineated by the 
White River, which then continued flowing eastward through the county's eastern area to discharge into the Missouri. Its upper central portion is drained by the Bad Horse Creek, which discharges into the Missouri near the midpoint of the county's north boundary.

The county terrain consists of rolling hills, sloping to the river drainages. Its area is largely devoted to agriculture.

Major highways

 Interstate 90
 U.S. Highway 83
 U.S. Highway 183
 South Dakota Highway 47
 South Dakota Highway 49
 South Dakota Highway 53
 South Dakota Highway 273
 South Dakota Highway 1806

Adjacent counties

 Hughes County - north
 Hyde County - northeast
 Buffalo County - northeast
 Brule County - east
 Charles Mix County - southeast
 Gregory County - south
 Tripp County - south
 Mellette County - southwest
 Jones County - west
 Stanley County - northwest

Protected areas

 Brakke State Game Production Area
 Brye Bottom State Game Production Area
 Bull Creek State Game Production Area
 Carpenter State Game Production Area
 Cedar Creek Recreation Area
 Counselor Creek Recreation Area
 Dude Ranch State Lakeside Use Area
 Fate Dam State Game Production Aea
 Fort Pierre National Grassland (part)
 Good Soldier Creek Recreation Area
 Iona State Game Production Area
 Iron Nation Recreation Area
 Lindely State Game Production Area
 Lower Brule Recreation Area
 Narrows Recreation Area
 Neugebauer State Game Production Area
 Reis Bottom State Game Production Area
 Salzmann State Game Production Area

Lakes
 Lake Francis Case (part)
 Lake Sharpe (part)

Demographics

2000 census
As of the 2000 United States Census, there were 3,895 people, 1,400 households, and 1,009 families in the county. The population density was 2 people per square mile (1/km2). There were 1,636 housing units at an average density of 1.0 per square mile (0.4/km2). The racial makeup of the county was 64.75% White, 0.08% Black or African American, 33.27% Native American, 0.23% Asian, 0.05% from other races, and 1.62% from two or more races. 0.46% of the population were Hispanic or Latino of any race.

There were 1,400 households, out of which 36.10% had children under the age of 18 living with them, 51.40% were married couples living together, 13.80% had a female householder with no husband present, and 27.90% were non-families. 24.60% of all households were made up of individuals, and 10.50% had someone living alone who was 65 years of age or older. The average household size was 2.77 and the average family size was 3.29.

The county population contained 32.10% under the age of 18, 7.60% from 18 to 24, 25.90% from 25 to 44, 20.90% from 45 to 64, and 13.60% who were 65 years of age or older. The median age was 34 years. For every 100 females there were 104.60 males. For every 100 females age 18 and over, there were 102.10 males.

The median income for a household in the county was $28,509, and the median income for a family was $32,028. Males had a median income of $22,628 versus $18,672 for females. The per capita income for the county was $13,862. About 19.40% of families and 24.30% of the population were below the poverty line, including 24.00% of those under age 18 and 12.90% of those age 65 or over.

2010 census
As of the 2010 United States Census, there were 3,755 people, 1,392 households, and 967 families in the county. The racial makeup of the county was 58.3% white, 38.2% American Indian, 0.3% Asian, 0.1% black or African American, 0.1% from other races, and 2.9% from two or more races. Those of Hispanic or Latino origin made up 1.1% of the population. In terms of ancestry, 27.3% were German, 9.2% were Irish, 9.1% were Norwegian, and 1.0% were American.

Of the 1,392 households, 35.6% had children under the age of 18 living with them, 47.1% were married couples living together, 15.2% had a female householder with no husband present, 30.5% were non-families, and 27.2% of all households were made up of individuals. The average household size was 2.67 and the average family size was 3.19. The median age was 36.1 years.

The median income for a household in the county was $36,323 and the median income for a family was $45,045. Males had a median income of $32,760 versus $25,512 for females. The per capita income for the county was $16,930. About 17.4% of families and 18.8% of the population were below the poverty line, including 25.4% of those under age 18 and 5.8% of those age 65 or over.

Communities

City
 Presho

Towns
 Kennebec (county seat)
 Oacoma
 Reliance

Census-designated places
 Lower Brule
 Vivian
 West Brule

Other unincorporated communities
 Iona
 Lyman

Townships

Bailey
Butte
Dorman
Fairland
Iona
Morningside
Oacoma
Pleasant
Pratt
Reliance
Rex
Rose
Rowe
Sioux
Stony Butte

Unorganized territories

 Black Dog
 Lafayette
 Lower Brule
 McClure
 Northwest Lyman
 South Lyman

Politics
Lyman County voters have been Republican for decades. In no national election has the county selected a Democratic Party candidate since 1964, although Jimmy Carter, Michael Dukakis, Bill Clinton and Barack Obama have all managed to exceed forty percent. When Hillary Clinton ran on the Democratic ticket in 2016, she won 26 percent of the county's vote, for the lowest Democratic result since Alton B. Parker in 1904 (22 percent).

See also
 National Register of Historic Places listings in Lyman County, South Dakota
 USS Lyman County (LST-903)

References

External links

 Lyman County Herald
 Lyman County website

 
South Dakota counties on the Missouri River
1893 establishments in South Dakota
Populated places established in 1893